John Smith (born 1901) was an English professional footballer who played as a forward.

Career
Born in Eccleshill, Smith moved from Harrogate Amateurs to Bradford City in August 1923. He made 38 league appearances for the club, scoring 6 goals, before signing for Blackburn Rovers in August 1926.

Sources

References

1901 births
Date of death missing
English footballers
Bradford City A.F.C. players
Blackburn Rovers F.C. players
English Football League players
Association football forwards